The Men's super combined competition at the 2015 World Championships was held on Sunday, February 8. 

Marcel Hirscher won the gold medal, despite originally finishing in 31st position after the downhill leg. Ondřej Bank however, fell on the final jump and, although the original results had Bank in 25th place, the jury disqualified him after the run ended and as a result, Hirscher was able to start first in the slalom leg instead of starting after the top 30. With a clean track he was able to rise all the way from 30th to 1st. Kjetil Jansrud took silver for Norway after leading the downhill leg. Bronze medalist Ted Ligety commenting on the race conditions and result, said, "It was dumb luck. If I was a half-second faster in the downhill, I wouldn’t have been able to get a medal at all. That’s how big of a difference I thought running early was."

Results
The downhill run was started at 10:00 MST and the slalom run at 14:15.

References

Men's super combined